The 2008 United States presidential election in New Mexico took place on November 4, 2008. Voters chose five representatives, or electors to the Electoral College, who voted for president and vice president.

New Mexico was won by the Democratic nominee, Senator Barack Obama of Illinois, by a 15.13% margin of victory; Obama took 56.91% of the vote while his Republican opponent, Senator John McCain of Arizona, took 41.78%. Prior to the election, all 17 news organizations considered this a state Obama would win, or otherwise considered it as a safe blue state. Due to the extremely narrow margins of victory in the previous two presidential elections (less than 1% in 2004 and less than 0.1% in 2000), it started out as a swing state, but hypothetical general election match-up polls taken in the state continued to show a big lead for Obama. Obama's leads in the polls in New Mexico increased so much that McCain did not campaign nearly as much there as he did elsewhere, despite it neighboring his home state of Arizona. A large Hispanic and Native American as well as a trending Democratic population put Obama over the top.

Primaries
 2008 New Mexico Democratic primary
 2008 New Mexico Republican primary

Campaign

Predictions
There were 16 news organizations that made state-by-state predictions of the election. Here are their last predictions before election day:

Polling

Obama won a majority of the pre-election polls taken in the state, including sweeping all of them taken after September 14. The final three polls averaged the Democrat leading 55% to 43%.

Fundraising
John McCain raised a total of $1,016,376 in the state. Barack Obama raised $3,987,438.

Advertising and visits
Obama and his interest groups spent $4,535,378. McCain and his interest groups spent $3,606,796. The Democrat ticket visited the state five times to the Republicans' eight times.

Analysis
Hispanic voters comprised 41% of New Mexico's electorate in 2008 and make up a plurality of the state's population. George W. Bush received over 40% of the Hispanic vote nationally in 2004. This support was enough for Bush to nip John Kerry by approximately 6,000 votes in New Mexico in 2004. In the previous two elections, New Mexico had been a very close swing state. Al Gore won the state by 300 votes in 2000, which was even narrower than the controversial results in Florida. However, during the 2008 election, New Mexico was regarded as a safe state for Obama. John McCain from neighboring Arizona and held similar views on illegal immigration to those of Bush. Ultimately, McCain obtained 31% of the national Hispanic vote to Obama's 67%, far less than Bush's 44% to John Kerry's 53% in 2004.

Native Americans also represent a key voting demographic in New Mexico. Obama won the Native American vote, 78–21%, and carried most of the counties within the confines of the Navajo Nation.

The Republican base in New Mexico consists of the more rural southeastern part of the state which, while thinly populated, votes heavily Republican. Democrats are strongest in the state capital, Santa Fe, and its close-in suburbs. The city of Albuquerque and the southwestern part of the state both lean Democratic, but not as overwhelmingly as does Santa Fe. On a larger context, Southern New Mexico is typically more Republican while Northern New Mexico is traditionally more Democratic, while Albuquerque and other areas in the center tend to swing both ways.

In 2008, Obama carried the state by a 15-point margin, largely by dominating the Albuquerque area.  He won Bernalillo County, home to Albuquerque itself, by 21 points; Kerry had won it by four points in 2004. While McCain dominated the southeastern part of the state, it was not nearly enough to overcome Obama's edge in the Albuquerque area.

During the same election, former Democratic U.S. Representative Tom Udall, who had represented New Mexico's 3rd Congressional District in the U.S. House of Representatives, defeated former Republican U.S. Representative Steve Pearce, who had represented New Mexico's 2nd congressional district, for an open U.S. Senate seat that was vacated by Republican Pete Domenici once it was discovered that he had brain cancer. Former Republican U.S. Representative Heather Wilson, who represented New Mexico's 1st Congressional District, vacated her seat to challenge Pearce in the GOP senatorial primary only to lose the nomination to him. As a result, all three of New Mexico's U.S. House seats were up for grabs, and Democrats captured all three of them. At the state level, Democrats increased their majorities in both houses of the New Mexico Legislature, picking up three seats in both the New Mexico House of Representatives and New Mexico Senate.

, this is the last election in which Luna County voted for the Democratic candidate.

Results

By county

Counties that flipped from Republican to Democratic
 Colfax (largest city: Raton)
 Hidalgo (largest city: Lordsburg)
 Los Alamos (largest city: Los Alamos)
 Luna (largest city: Deming)
 Sandoval (largest city: Bernalillo)
 Valencia (largest village: Los Lunas)

By congressional district
Barack Obama carried 2 of the state's 3 congressional districts, while John McCain just narrowly carried the other congressional district that simultaneously elected a Democrat.

Electors 

Officially the voters of New Mexico cast their ballots for electors: representatives to the Electoral College. New Mexico is allocated five electors because it has three congressional districts and two senators. All candidates who appear on the ballot or qualify to receive write-in votes must submit a list of five electors, who pledge to vote for their candidate and his or her running mate. Whoever wins the majority of votes in the state is awarded all five electoral votes. Their chosen electors then vote for president and vice president. Although electors are pledged to their candidate and running mate, they are not obligated to vote for them. An elector who votes for someone other than his or her candidate is known as a faithless elector.

The electors of each state and of the District of Columbia met on December 15, 2008, to cast their votes for president and vice president. The Electoral College itself never meets as one body; instead the electors from each state and the District of Columbia meet in their respective capitols.

The following were the members of the Electoral College from the state. All five were pledged to Barack Obama and Joe Biden:
 Brian Colon
 Annadelle Sanchez
 Tom Buckner
 Christy French
 Alvin Warren

References

New Mexico
2008 New Mexico elections
2008